This is a list of alleged sightings of unidentified flying objects or UFOs in Africa.

Algeria
During the Algerian War (1954-1962), many UFO sighthings were reported around conflict zones. In March 1975, several UFOs were observed across the country "by respectable people".

Morocco
On 12 July 1952, 2 elongated flying saucers were spotted by policemen during night time above Had Kourt. The following day, at 11;45 pm, inhabitants of Fedala spotted a blue-green, ball-shaped object flying at high speed and making a trail of light. The day after, at 9:00 am, a couple observed another flying saucer for about 30 seconds.

Senegal
On 3 July 1952, a flying saucer was spotted above Dakar at 6:08 am. The saucer was described as flat and tapered, going to a great speed, and surrounded by flames. As the saucer flew by going southwards, eyewitnesses described that stars were not visible anymore.

Sudan
In January 2018, a UFO was spotted in the skies over Khartoum that the military has identified as a potential satellite (possibly the failed US satellite Zuma according to one scientist), even though it admitted not being able to clearly identify the flying object.

Tunisia
In July 1969, many observers, including US embassy officials, reported a full-moon sized, two-part green-blue flying object in the sky of Tunis. It reportedly exploded forming a greenish circular cloud.

Zimbabwe

On 14 September 1994, 62 children from a school in Ruwa witnessed the landing of a large spaceship and many smaller ones near their school. The children described the aliens who stepped out of the spaceships as having "large heads, two holes for nostrils, a slit for a mouth or no mouth at all, and long black hair, and were dressed in dark, single-piece suits".  The American psychiatrist John E. Mack interviewed a number of the children involved in the incident and concluded it was likely not an incident of mass hysteria as 12 of the children had given consistent accounts of the event. Mack stated that the interviews also revealed a consistent "impression [given by the children that] some form of sentient life cared about the Earth and cared about the environment and even cared about the children.”

South Africa

See also
 List of reported UFO sightings

Bibliography
Cynthia Hind, Ufos Over Africa. Horus House Pr. 1 June 1997. ISBN 978-1881852155

References

Africa
Events in Africa